Elections to Lambeth London Borough Council were held in May 1974.  The whole council was up for election. Turnout was 28.3%. This election was the last one that had aldermen as well as councillors. Labour got all 10 aldermen.

Election result

|}

Ward results

References

1974
1974 London Borough council elections
20th century in the London Borough of Lambeth